The Chen Sheng and Wu Guang uprising, July–December 209 B.C., was the first uprising against the Qin dynasty following the death of Qin Shi Huang. Led by Chen Sheng and Wu Guang, the uprising helped overthrow the Qin and paved the way for the Han dynasty, one of China's greatest golden ages.

Name 
It is also called:

 Chen Sheng and Wu Guang Rebellion, 
 Dazexiang uprising as the uprising started in Dazexiang (大泽乡), which translates into "Big Swamp Village".

History 
Chen Sheng and Wu Guang were both army officers who were ordered to lead their bands of commoner soldiers north to participate in the defense of Yuyang. However, they were stopped halfway in present-day Anhui province by flooding from a severe rainstorm. The harsh Qin laws mandated execution for those who showed up late for government jobs, regardless of the nature of the delay. Figuring that they would rather fight than accept execution, Chen and Wu organized a band of 900 villagers to rebel against the government.

There are two stories for this uprising. To convince people to support this uprising, Chen Sheng and Wu Guang wrote "King Chen Sheng" on a piece of silk, and placed it in the belly of a fish. A man in this army bought the fish and was surprised to find the message. They also taught animals to say "Da Chu flourishes, King Chen Sheng" to make people believe in them. 

With Chen's men declaring him king of the former Kingdom of Chu, he and Wu became the centre of armed uprisings all over China.  Over the course of just a few months, their strength grew to around ten thousand men, a force composed mostly of discontented peasants. However, in less than a year, their uprising faced serious trouble; their force was no match for the highly skilled battlefield tactics of the professional Qin soldiers and both were assassinated by their own men.

While their insurrection was ultimately unsuccessful, Wu and Chen set up the example that was to be followed by Liu Bang and Xiang Yu. Their spirit can be summed up in Chen's quote "" (traditional Chinese: ,; "Are kings and nobles given their high status by birth?"), meaning that every human, regardless of birth, can become something great if he applies himself.

Historical materials 
There is a biography of Chen Sheng and Wu Guang, which is called aristocratic family of Chen Sheng, in Records of the Grand Historian. The main points of the passage are as follows. Chen Sheng was a tenant who was born in Henan province and Wu Guang was his townsman. When Chen Sheng was young, he used to plow with some peasants. One day, he felt tired, then he stopped working and went to a hill for a rest. 

At that time, he said to his companions "If someone among us rises to power and position, please don't forget us." ("") 

His companions laughed at him and said "You are a tenant, how can you be rich and powerful?" ("") 

Chen Sheng sighed and said "How can a sparrow comprehend the ambition of a swan?" ("")

Later on, Chen Sheng became an army officer, and led the uprising with Wu Guang, his deputy. Wu Guang was a kind and influential man, but nothing more could be found about him from the history records.

References

200s BC conflicts
209 BC
Military history of the Qin dynasty
Peasant revolts
3rd century BC in China